The 1921 Atlantic hurricane season featured the most recent major hurricane to strike the Tampa Bay area in Florida. Although no "hurricane season" was defined at the time, the present-day delineation of such is June 1 to November 30. The first system, a tropical depression, developed on June 1, while the last, a tropical storm, dissipated on November 25. Of note, three of the twelve cyclones co-existed with another tropical cyclone during the season.

Of the season's twelve tropical cyclones, seven became tropical storms and five strengthened into hurricanes. Furthermore, two of these strengthened into a major hurricane—Category 3 or higher on the modern-day Saffir–Simpson hurricane wind scale—the most since the 1917 season. Throughout Florida, the hurricane left about $10 million (1921 USD) in damage and eight deaths. Two other cyclones left extensive impacts. Although not a tropical cyclone at the time, the remnants of the second hurricane contributed to a devastating flood in the Greater San Antonio area of Texas, which resulted in $19 million in damage and 215 fatalities. The third hurricane left thousands homeless in the Lesser Antilles and caused at least 81 deaths.

The season's activity was reflected with an accumulated cyclone energy (ACE) rating of 87, above the 1921–1930 average of 76.6. ACE is a metric used to express the energy used by a tropical cyclone during its lifetime. Therefore, a storm with a longer duration will have high values of ACE. It is only calculated at six-hour increments in which specific tropical and subtropical systems are either at or above sustained wind speeds of 39 mph (63 km/h), which is the threshold for tropical storm intensity. Thus, tropical depressions are not included here.


Timeline

Systems

Hurricane One 

A westward-moving disturbance developed into a tropical depression over the western Caribbean Sea on June 16. About 24 hours later, the depression intensified into a tropical storm. The cyclone moved northwestward and weakened slightly while crossing the Yucatán Peninsula, but remained a tropical storm. Early on June 18, the system emerged into the Gulf of Mexico and began to curve north-northwestward. Continuing to intensify, it attained hurricane status around 12:00 UTC on June 20. The hurricane drifted and strengthened further. At approximately 18:00 UTC, the cyclone made landfall near Matagorda, Texas, at the same intensity. The hurricane quickly fell to tropical storm intensity, and then weakened to a tropical depression around 12:00 UTC on June 23. However, the depression persisted for a few more days, until dissipating over northern Missouri on June 26.

Washouts occurred along the Gulf, Colorado and Santa Fe Railway between Highland Bayou and Virginia Point. Abnormally high tides also sunk several launches and a number of small boats and damaged many fishing piers. Winds damaged crops to some extent, shattered windows, toppled signs, and downed some trees. Rainfall totals in Austwell, Columbus, Edna, Hempstead, Matagorda, Navasota, Pierce, Rosenberg, and Sealy all set records for the most precipitation for any day in the month of June in their respective towns. One death occurred in Longview when a man was struck by lightning, with the same bolt also killing two calves and a cow.

Hurricane Two 

An area of disturbed weather developed into a tropical depression over the Bay of Campeche on September 4. The depression moved slowly northwestward and reached tropical storm intensity by 00:00 UTC on September 6. The storm then curved west-northwestward and reached hurricane intensity about twenty four hours. At 03:00 UTC on September 7, the hurricane made landfall in Mexico just north of Tampico, Tamaulipas. After moving inland, the storm weakened and dissipated early on September 8.

After the cyclone dissipated on September 8, an extremely heavy rainfall event ensued across central Texas, which continued into September 11. The deluge led to one of the most destructive floods in the history of San Antonio. The most significant river floods occurred along the Little and San Gabriel rivers, where 159 people perished. Combined with the death toll from elsewhere across the region, 215 people died due to this storm and damages were estimated at $19 million.

Hurricane Three 

It moved nearly due westward and struck the Windward Islands on September 8 as a Category 1 hurricane. The storm moved northwestward across the Caribbean and intensified into a major hurricane on September 9. The storm weakened to a Category 2 hurricane after striking the island, but re-strengthened into a Category 3 while northeast of the Bahamas on September 13. The storm curved northeastward on September 14 and began accelerated. On the following day, the system weakened to a Category 2 hurricane near Bermuda. The remnants were absorbed by a larger extratropical storm later on September 17.

On Grenada, a number of homes were destroyed, while several other buildings suffered damage. The storm severely damaged nutmeg and cocoa crops, the latter of which was estimated to require at least seven years to be re-established. Telephone communications in rural areas were lost. At least two deaths occurred on the island. On Saint Vincent, trees and telegraph and telephone lines were downed. Extensive crop and property damage was reported, with thousands of people left homeless. Strong winds on Trinidad disrupted telegraphic communications. A number of lights and small craft at Port of Spain and San Fernando were sunk or washed ashore. Two fatalities occurred on the island, one from drowning and the other from electrocution. Throughout the Windward Islands, 80 deaths were reported. Strong winds generated by the storm caused extensive damage to buildings in Puerto Rico and Bermuda, with one fatality in the former. This storm is also known as the San Pedro hurricane.

Hurricane Four 

The storm moved slowly west-northwestward over the next few days with little change in intensity. By September 10, the cyclone curved north-northeastward, sped-up, and began to strengthen. Late on September 11, the storm reached hurricane status. The hurricane accelerated after bypassing the island due to an approaching cold front. A ship observed a barometric pressure of  around 09:00 UTC on September 14, the lowest known pressure in relation to the storm. Three hours later, however, the hurricane transitioned into an extratropical cyclone about 400 mi (640 km) southeast of Newfoundland. The extratropical storm was absorbed by a larger extratropical cyclone late on September 14.

Tropical Storm Five 

The depression moved rapidly north-northeastward and made landfall near Cape Coral, Florida, several hours later. Shortly after emerging into the Atlantic near Cape Canaveral early on October 16, the cyclone intensified into a tropical storm. The remnants continued eastward across the Atlantic and intensified into the equivalence of a Category 1 hurricane while approaching the Azores. The extratropical cyclone then moved in a semi-circulation path before dissipating southwest of the islands early on October 24.

Hurricane Six 

A tropical storm developed from a trough in the southwestern Caribbean Sea on October 20. The system moved northwestward and intensified into a hurricane on October 22 and a major hurricane by October 23. After entering the Gulf of Mexico, the hurricane gradually curved northeastward and weakened to a Category 3 before making landfall near Tarpon Springs, Florida, late on October 25. The storm quickly weakened to a Category 1 hurricane while crossing Central Florida, before reaching the Atlantic Ocean early on the following day. Thereafter, system moved east-southeastward and remained fairly steady in intensity before weakening to a tropical storm late on October 29. The storm was then absorbed by a larger extratropical cyclone early the next day, with the remnants of the hurricane soon becoming indistinguishable.

The storm brought strong winds to the Swan Islands, including hurricane-force winds on the main island. Heavy rains fell in Cuba, particularly in Pinar del Río Province, but only minor damage occurred. In Florida, storm surge and abnormally high tides caused damage along much of the state's west coast from Pasco County southward. Several neighborhoods and sections of Tampa were inundated, especially in Ballast Point, DeSoto Park, Edgewater Park, Hyde Park, Palmetto Beach, and other areas in the vicinity of Bayshore Boulevard. Strong winds also damaged hundreds of trees, signs, buildings, and homes. Five deaths occurred in Tampa, two from drowning and three after people came into contact with a live wire. The storm left two additional fatalities in St. Petersburg. A number of streets in Tarpon Springs were littered with masses of debris, with many structures and trees suffering extensive damage. Strong winds occurred as far east as the Atlantic coast of the state, though wind damage east of the Tampa Bay area was generally limited to downed trees and power lines, resulting in power outages, particularly in Orlando. Agriculture throughout the state experienced significant impact as well, including over $2 million in damage and the loss of at least 800,000 boxes of citrus crops alone. Overall, the hurricane left at least eight deaths and about $10 million in damage.

Tropical Storm Seven 

Moving west-northwestward, the depression slowly strengthened, becoming a tropical storm on November 20. Late on November 21, the storm began moving west-southwestward while centered near Long Island. The cyclone then began steadily weakening. Early on November 23, the storm emerged over the Gulf of Batabanó and soon weakened to a tropical depression. The system moved westward, brushing Isla de la Juventud and striking Pinar del Río Province early on November 24. After emerging into the Gulf of Mexico, the storm curved northward and drifted, until dissipating on November 25. This storm was not considered a tropical cyclone until 2009, as part of the Atlantic hurricane reanalysis project, which researches information about past tropical cyclones to reduce inaccuracies and omissions in the best track. The cyclone left no significant impacts in the Bahamas, Cuba, or Florida.

Other systems 
In addition to the seven tropical storms, five other systems formed but failed to reach tropical storm intensity. The first such cyclone developed over the northwestern Caribbean on June 1. Moving quickly northeastward, the depression crossed Cuba and the Bahamas before reaching the western Atlantic. The depression became extratropical by June 3. On July 5, a tropical depression formed in the northeastern Gulf of Mexico. Tracking to the west, the depression degenerated into a trough while offshore Louisiana on July 8. The depression regained a closed circulation by July 10, shortly before making landfall near Galveston. By July 11, the system dissipated over northern Texas.

Another tropical depression developed from a low pressure area over the northeastern Gulf of Mexico on July 28. The depression tracked northwestward and made landfall in Franklin County, Florida, early on July 29. It dissipated over Georgia by the next day. A tropical depression formed in the Bay of Campeche on September 23. The depression moved westward into Mexico just north of Veracruz and is believed to have dissipated later that day. The final system which failed to reach tropical storm intensity formed over the Bay of Campeche on October 5 as a low pressure system along a decaying cold front. The depression made landfall in Mexico and rapidly dissipated.

See also 

 List of tropical cyclones
 Atlantic hurricane season
 1900–1940 South Pacific cyclone seasons
 1900–1950 South-West Indian Ocean cyclone seasons
 1920s Australian region cyclone seasons

References

External links 

 Monthly Weather Review

 
Articles which contain graphical timelines
1921 meteorology
1921 natural disasters
Atlantic hurricane seasons